is a Japanese football player. He plays for Fujieda MYFC.

Career
Daiki Deoka joined J2 League club Thespakusatsu Gunma in 2017.

Club statistics
Updated to 22 February 2019.

References

External links

Profile at Thespakusatsu Gunma

1994 births
Living people
Kwansei Gakuin University alumni
Association football people from Osaka Prefecture
Japanese footballers
J2 League players
J3 League players
Thespakusatsu Gunma players
Fujieda MYFC players
Association football midfielders